The Pareto principle states that for many outcomes, roughly 80% of consequences come from 20% of causes (the "vital few"). Other names for this principle are the 80/20 rule, the law of the vital few, or the principle of factor sparsity.

Management consultant Joseph M. Juran developed the concept in the context of quality control and improvement after reading the works of Italian sociologist and economist Vilfredo Pareto, who wrote about the 80/20 connection while teaching at the University of Lausanne. In his first work, Cours d'économie politique, Pareto showed that approximately 80% of the land in the Kingdom of Italy was owned by 20% of the population. The Pareto principle is only tangentially related to the Pareto efficiency.

Mathematically, the 80/20 rule is roughly described by a power law distribution (also known as a Pareto distribution) for a particular set of parameters. Many natural phenomena distribute according to power law statistics. It is an adage of business management that "80% of sales come from 20% of clients".

In economics 

Pareto's observation was in connection with population and wealth. Pareto noticed that approximately 80% of Italy's land was owned by 20% of the population. He then carried out surveys on a variety of other countries and found to his surprise that a similar distribution applied.  (See Concentration of land ownership)

A chart that gave the effect a very visible and comprehensible form, the so-called "champagne glass" effect, was contained in the 1992 United Nations Development Program Report, which showed that distribution of global income is very uneven, with the richest 20% of the world's population receiving 82.7% of the world's income. However, among nations, the Gini index shows that wealth distributions vary substantially around this norm.

The principle also holds within the tails of the distribution. The physicist Victor Yakovenko of the University of Maryland, College Park and AC Silva analyzed income data from the US Internal Revenue Service from 1983 to 2001, and found that the income distribution of the richest 1–3% of the population also follows Pareto's principle.

In computing 
In computer science the Pareto principle can be applied to optimization efforts. For example, Microsoft noted that by fixing the top 20% of the most-reported bugs, 80% of the related errors and crashes in a given system would be eliminated. Lowell Arthur expressed that "20% of the code has 80% of the errors. Find them, fix them!"  It was also discovered that, in general, 80% of a piece of software can be written in 20% of the total allocated time. Conversely, the hardest 20% of the code takes 80% of the time. This factor is usually a part of COCOMO estimating for software coding.

Occupational health and safety 
Occupational health and safety professionals use the Pareto principle to underline the importance of hazard prioritization. Assuming 20% of the hazards account for 80% of the injuries, and by categorizing hazards, safety professionals can target those 20% of the hazards that cause 80% of the injuries or accidents. Alternatively, if hazards are addressed in random order, a safety professional is more likely to fix one of the 80% of hazards that account only for some fraction of the remaining 20% of injuries.

Aside from ensuring efficient accident prevention practices, the Pareto principle also ensures hazards are addressed in an economical order, because the technique ensures the utilized resources are best used to prevent the most accidents.

Other applications

Engineering and quality control

The Pareto principle is sometimes used in quality control where it was first created. It is the basis for the Pareto chart, one of the key tools used in total quality control and Six Sigma techniques. The Pareto principle serves as a baseline for ABC-analysis and XYZ-analysis, widely used in logistics and procurement for the purpose of optimizing stock of goods, as well as costs of keeping and replenishing that stock. In engineering control theory, such as for electromechanical energy converters, the 80/20 principle applies to optimization efforts.

In the systems science discipline, Joshua M. Epstein and Robert Axtell created an agent-based simulation model called Sugarscape, from a decentralized modeling approach, based on individual behavior rules defined for each agent in the economy.  Wealth distribution and Pareto's 80/20 principle emerged in their results, which suggests the principle is a collective consequence of these individual rules.

Health and social outcomes

In 2009, the Agency for Healthcare Research and Quality said 20 percent patients incurred 80 percent of health-care expenses due to chronic conditions. A 2021 analysis showed unequal distribution of healthcare costs, with older patients and those with poorer health incurring more costs. A New Zealand Dunedin Study that by the age of 38, 22% of children in the study accounted for 81% of criminal convictions, 78% of pharmaceutical prescriptions, and 66% of welfare benefits within the group. This statistic has been used to support both stop-and-frisk policies and broken windows policing, as catching those criminals committing minor crimes will supposedly net many criminals wanted for (or who would normally commit) larger ones.

The "20/80 rule" has been proposed as a rule of thumb for the infection distribution in superspreading events, however, the degree of infectiousness has been found to be distributed continuously in the population.  In epidemics with super-spreading, the majority of individuals infect relatively few secondary contacts.

General distribution operations

The Pareto principle is often referred to in distribution operations, normally called the 80/20 rule.  In distribution operations it is common to observe that 80% of the production volume constitute 20% of the SKUs (Stock Keeping Units). During facility design, this rule often governs the storage area and processing area configurations.

Video rentals

In 1988, many video rental shops reported that 80% of revenue came from 20% of videotapes. A video-chain executive discussed the "Gone with the Wind syndrome", however, in which every store had to offer classics like Gone with the Wind, Casablanca, or The African Queen to appear to have a large inventory, even if customers very rarely rented them.

Mathematical notes 

Valid application of the rule requires demonstrating not that one can explain most of the variance or that some small set of observations are explained by a small proportion of process variables, but rather that a large proportion of process variation is associated with a small proportion of the process variables.

This is a special case of the wider phenomenon of Pareto distributions. If the Pareto index α, which is one of the parameters characterizing a Pareto distribution, is chosen as α = log45 ≈ 1.16, then one has 80% of effects coming from 20% of causes.

It follows that one also has 80% of that top 80% of effects coming from 20% of that top 20% of causes, and so on. Eighty percent of 80% is 64%; 20% of 20% is 4%, so this implies a "64/4" law; and similarly implies a "51.2/0.8" law. Similarly for the bottom 80% of causes and bottom 20% of effects, the bottom 80% of the bottom 80% only cause 20% of the remaining 20%. This is broadly in line with the world population/wealth table above, where the bottom 60% of the people own 5.5% of the wealth, approximating to a 64/4 connection.

The 64/4 correlation also implies a 32% 'fair' area between the 4% and 64%, where the lower 80% of the top 20% (16%) and upper 20% of the bottom 80% (also 16%) relates to the corresponding lower top and upper bottom of effects (32%). This is also broadly in line with the world population table above, where the second 20% control 12% of the wealth, and the bottom of the top 20% (presumably) control 16% of the wealth.

The term 80/20 is only a shorthand for the general principle at work.  In individual cases, the distribution could just as well be, say, nearer to 90/10 or 70/30.  There is no need for the two numbers to add up to the number 100, as they are measures of different things, (e.g., 'number of customers' vs 'amount spent').  However, each case in which they do not add up to 100%, is equivalent to one in which they do. For example, as noted above, the "64/4 law" (in which the two numbers do not add up to 100%) is equivalent to the "80/20 law" (in which they do add up to 100%).  Thus, specifying two percentages independently does not lead to a broader class of distributions than what one gets by specifying the larger one and letting the smaller one be its complement relative to 100%.  Thus, there is only one degree of freedom in the choice of that parameter.

Adding up to 100 leads to a nice symmetry. For example, if 80% of effects come from the top 20% of sources, then the remaining 20% of effects come from the lower 80% of sources. This is called the "joint ratio", and can be used to measure the degree of imbalance: a joint ratio of 96:4 is extremely imbalanced, 80:20 is highly imbalanced (Gini index: 76%), 70:30 is moderately imbalanced (Gini index: 28%), and 55:45 is just slightly imbalanced (Gini index 14%).

The Pareto principle is an illustration of a "power law" relationship, which also occurs in phenomena such as bush fires and earthquakes.
Because it is self-similar over a wide range of magnitudes, it produces outcomes completely different from Normal or Gaussian distribution phenomena. This fact explains the frequent breakdowns of sophisticated financial instruments, which are modeled on the assumption that a Gaussian relationship is appropriate to something like stock price movements.

Gini coefficient and Hoover index 
Using the "A : B" notation (for example, 0.8:0.2) and with A + B = 1, inequality measures like the Gini index (G) and the Hoover index (H) can be computed. In this case both are the same.

See also 

1% rule
10/90 gap
Benford's law
Diminishing returns
Elephant flow
Keystone species
Long tail
Matthew effect
Mathematical economics
Megadiverse countries
Ninety–ninety rule
Pareto distribution
Pareto priority index
Parkinson's law
Peter principle
Power law
Price's law
Principle of least effort
Profit risk
Rank–size distribution
Regression toward the mean
Sturgeon's law
Vitality curve
Wealth concentration
Zipf's law
Microtransaction whale

References

Further reading 

.

External links

Pareto Principle: Rule of causes and consequences
ParetoRule.cf : Pareto Rule
ParetoRule.cf : The Pareto Rule
About.com: Pareto's Principle
Wealth Condensation in Pareto Macro-Economies
The Pareto Principle: Accomplishing goals with purpose

Statistical laws
Rules of thumb
Tails of probability distributions
Statistical principles
Adages
Vilfredo Pareto